The Independent is an online newspaper covering news, opinions and local events, trends, and issues in Newfoundland and Labrador. The original weekly (paper) version of The Independent was founded in 2001. The online version was launched in February 2011.

Organization and perception 
The Independent is edited by Drew Brown; it was previously operated by Justin Brake. 

In 2012, author and academic Maura Hanrahan published a paper in Native Studies Review that stated "The Independent is considered the most progressive newspaper in the province [of Newfoundland and Labrador]"

History
The Independent was a weekly print newspaper that switched to online.

Reporter and editor Justin Brake was arrested while covering the Muskrat Falls protests in 2016, prompting condemnation from the Canadian Journalists for Free Expression and the Canadian Association of Journalists in 2017. Brake's reporting won a press freedom award in 2018. All charges were dismissed in 2019.

See also
List of newspapers in Canada

References

External links

Journalist facing possible arrest for Muskrat Falls coverage says story is of ‘utmost importance’, Jorge Barrera, APTN National News, 2016

Newspapers published in St. John's, Newfoundland and Labrador
Weekly newspapers published in Newfoundland and Labrador
Online newspapers with defunct print editions
Canadian online journalism